Tropimerus is a genus of beetles in the family Cerambycidae, containing the following species:

 Tropimerus cyaneus Giesbert, 1987
 Tropimerus hovorei Giesbert, 1987

References

Elaphidiini